Ida B. Wells (full name: Ida Bell Wells-Barnett) (July 16, 1862 – March 25, 1931) was an American investigative journalist, educator, and early leader in the civil rights movement. She was one of the founders of the National Association for the Advancement of Colored People (NAACP). Wells dedicated her lifetime to combating prejudice and violence, the fight for African-American equality, especially that of women, and became arguably the most famous Black woman in the United States of her time.

Born into slavery in Holly Springs, Mississippi, Wells was freed by the Emancipation Proclamation during the American Civil War. At the age of 14, she lost both her parents and her infant brother in the 1878 yellow fever epidemic. She went to work and kept the rest of the family together with the help of her grandmother. Later, moving with some of her siblings to Memphis, Tennessee, Wells found better pay as a teacher. Soon, Wells co-owned and wrote for the Memphis Free Speech and Headlight newspaper. Her reporting in the newspaper covered incidents of racial segregation and inequality.

In the 1890s, Wells documented lynching in the United States in articles and through her pamphlets called Southern Horrors: Lynch Law in all its Phases, and The Red Record, investigating frequent claims of whites that lynchings were reserved for Black criminals only. Wells exposed lynching as a barbaric practice of whites in the South used to intimidate and oppress African Americans who created economic and political competition—and a subsequent threat of loss of power—for whites. Wells's pamphlet set out to tell the truth behind the rising violence in the South against African Americans. At this time, the white press continued to paint the African Americans involved in the incident as villains and whites as innocent victims. Ida B. Wells was a respected voice in the African American community in the South that people listened to. Thus, Wells's pamphlet was needed to show people the truth about this violence and advocate for justice for African Americans in the South. A white mob destroyed her newspaper office and presses as her investigative reporting was carried nationally in Black-owned newspapers. Subjected to continued threats, Wells left Memphis for Chicago. She married Ferdinand L. Barnett in 1895 and had a family while continuing her work writing, speaking, and organizing for civil rights and the women's movement for the rest of her life.

Wells was outspoken regarding her beliefs as a Black female activist and faced regular public disapproval, sometimes including from other leaders within the civil rights movement and the women's suffrage movement. She was active in women's rights and the women's suffrage movement, establishing several notable women's organizations. A skilled and persuasive speaker, Wells traveled nationally and internationally on lecture tours. Wells died of kidney disease on March 25, 1931, in Chicago, and in 2020 was posthumously honored with a Pulitzer Prize special citation "for her outstanding and courageous reporting on the horrific and vicious violence against African Americans during the era of lynching."

Early life 

Ida Bell Wells was born on the Bolling Farm near Holly Springs, Mississippi, July 16, 1862. She was the eldest child of James Madison Wells (1840–1878) and Elizabeth "Lizzie" (Warrenton). James Wells' father was a White man who impregnated an enslaved Black woman named Peggy. Before dying, James' father brought him, aged 18, to Holly Springs to become a carpenter's apprentice. Upon learning carpentry skills, he was able to work for hire in Holly Springs, with his wages going to his slaveholder. Lizzie's experience as an enslaved person was quite different. One of 10 children born on a plantation in Virginia, Lizzie was sold away from her family and siblings and tried without success to locate her family following the Civil War. Before the Emancipation Proclamation was issued, Wells' parents were enslaved to Spires Boling, an architect, and the family lived in the structure now called Bolling–Gatewood House, which has become the Ida B. Wells-Barnett Museum.

After emancipation, Wells' father, James Wells, became a trustee of Shaw College (now Rust College). He refused to vote for Democratic candidates (see Southern Democrats) during the period of Reconstruction, became a member of the Loyal League, and was known as a "race man" for his involvement in politics and his commitment to the Republican Party. He founded a successful carpentry business in Holly Springs in 1867, and his wife Lizzie became known as a "famous cook".

Ida B. Wells was one of the eight children, and she enrolled in the historically Black liberal arts college Rust College in Holly Springs (formerly Shaw College). In September 1878, tragedy struck the Wells family when both of Ida's parents died during a yellow fever epidemic that also claimed a sibling. Wells had been visiting her grandmother's farm near Holly Springs at the time and was spared.

Following the funerals of her parents and brother, friends and relatives decided that the five remaining Wells children should be separated and sent to foster homes. Wells resisted this proposition. To keep her younger siblings together as a family, she found work as a teacher in a rural Black elementary school outside Holly Springs. Her paternal grandmother, Peggy Wells (née Peggy Cheers; 1814–1887), along with other friends and relatives, stayed with her siblings and cared for them during the week while Wells was teaching.

About two years after Wells' grandmother Peggy had a stroke and her sister Eugenia died, Wells and her two youngest sisters moved to Memphis to live with an aunt, Fanny Butler ( Fanny Wells; 1837–1908), in 1883.

Early career and anti-segregation activism 

Soon after moving to Memphis, Tennessee, Wells was hired in Woodstock by the Shelby County school system. During her summer vacations, she attended summer sessions at Fisk University, a historically Black college in Nashville, Tennessee. She also attended Lemoyne-Owen College, a historically Black college in Memphis. She held strong political opinions and provoked many people with her views on women's rights. At the age of 24, she wrote: "I will not begin at this late day by doing what my soul abhors; sugaring men, weak deceitful creatures, with flattery to retain them as escorts or to gratify a revenge."

On May 4, 1884, a train conductor with the Chesapeake & Ohio Railroad ordered Wells to give up her seat in the first-class ladies car and move to the smoking car, which was already crowded with other passengers. The previous year, the United States Supreme Court had ruled against the federal Civil Rights Act of 1875 (which had banned racial discrimination in public accommodations). This verdict supported railroad companies that chose to racially segregate their passengers. When Wells refused to give up her seat, the conductor and two men dragged her out of the car. Wells gained publicity in Memphis when she wrote a newspaper article for The Living Way, a Black church weekly, about her treatment on the train. In Memphis, she hired an African-American attorney to sue the railroad. When her lawyer was paid off by the railroad, she hired a White attorney.

She won her case on December 24, 1884, when the local circuit court granted her a $500 award. The railroad company appealed to the Tennessee Supreme Court, which reversed the lower court's ruling in 1887. It concluded: "We think it is evident that the purpose of the defendant in error was to harass with a view to this suit, and that her persistence was not in good faith to obtain a comfortable seat for the short ride." Wells was ordered to pay court costs. Her reaction to the higher court's decision revealed her strong convictions on civil rights and religious faith, as she responded: "I felt so disappointed because I had hoped such great things from my suit for my people. ... O God, is there no ... justice in this land for us?"

While continuing to teach elementary school, Wells became increasingly active as a journalist and writer. She accepted an editorial position for a small Memphis journal, the Evening Star, and she began writing weekly articles for The Living Way newspaper under the pen name "Iola". Articles she wrote under her pen name attacked racist Jim Crow policies. In 1889, she became editor and co-owner with J. L. Fleming of The Free Speech and Headlight, a Black-owned newspaper established by the Reverend Taylor Nightingale (1844–1922) and based at the Beale Street Baptist Church in Memphis.

In 1891, Wells was dismissed from her teaching post by the Memphis Board of Education due to her articles criticizing conditions in the Black schools of the region. She was devastated but undaunted, and concentrated her energy on writing articles for The Living Way and the Free Speech and Headlight.

Anti-lynching campaign and investigative journalism

The lynching at The Curve in Memphis 

In 1889, Thomas Henry Moss, Sr. (1853–1892), an African American, opened People's Grocery, which he co-owned. The store was located in a South Memphis neighborhood nicknamed "The Curve". Wells was close to Moss and his family, having stood as godmother to his first child, Maurine E. Moss (1891–1971). Moss's store did well and competed with a White-owned grocery store across the street, Barrett's Grocery, owned by William Russell Barrett (1854–1920).

On March 2, 1892, a young Black male youth named Armour Harris was playing a game of marbles with a young White male youth named Cornelius Hurst in front of the People's Grocery. The two male youths got into an argument during the game, then began to fight. As the Black youth, Harris, seemed to be winning the fight, the father of Cornelius Hurst intervened and began to "thrash" Harris. The People's Grocery employees William Stewart and Calvin R. McDowell (1870–1892) saw the fight and rushed outside to defend the young Harris from the adult Hurst as people in the neighborhood gathered into what quickly became a "racially charged mob".

The White grocer Barrett returned the following day, March 3, 1892, to the People's Grocery with a Shelby County Sheriff's Deputy, looking for William Stewart. Calvin McDowell, who greeted Barrett, indicated that Stewart was not present, but Barrett was dissatisfied with the response and was frustrated that the People's Grocery was competing with his store. Angry about the previous day's mêlée, Barrett responded that "Blacks were thieves" and hit McDowell with a pistol. McDowell wrestled the gun away and fired at Barrett—missing narrowly. McDowell was later arrested but subsequently released.

On March 5, 1892, a group of six White men including a sheriff's deputy took electric streetcars to the People's Grocery. The group of White men were met by a barrage of bullets from the People's Grocery, and Shelby County Sheriff Deputy Charley Cole was wounded, as well as civilian Bob Harold. Hundreds of Whites were deputized almost immediately to put down what was perceived by the local Memphis newspapers Commercial and Appeal-Avalanche as an armed rebellion by Black men in Memphis.

Thomas Moss, a postman in addition to being the owner of the People's Grocery, was named as a conspirator along with McDowell and Stewart. The three men were arrested and jailed pending trial.

Around 2:30 a.m. on the morning of March 9, 1892, 75 men wearing black masks took Moss, McDowell, and Stewart from their jail cells at the Shelby County Jail to a Chesapeake and Ohio rail yard one mile north of the city and shot them dead. The Memphis Appeal-Avalanche reports:

Just before he was killed, Moss said to the mob: "Tell my people to go west, there is no justice here."

After the lynching of her friends, Wells wrote in Free Speech and Headlight urging Blacks to leave Memphis altogether:
There is, therefore, only one thing left to do; save our money and leave a town which will neither protect our lives and property, nor give us a fair trial in the courts, but takes us out and murders us in cold blood when accused by White persons.

The event led Wells to begin investigating lynchings using investigative journalist techniques. She began to interview people associated with lynchings, including a lynching in Tunica, Mississippi, in 1892 where she concluded that the father of a young White woman had implored a lynch mob to kill a Black man with whom his daughter was having a sexual relationship, under a pretense "to save the reputation of his daughter".

Free Speech newspaper destroyed by a mob 
Wells' anti-lynching commentaries in the Free Speech had been building, particularly with respect to lynchings and imprisonment of Black men suspected of raping White women. A story broke on January 16, 1892, in the Cleveland Gazette, describing a wrongful conviction for a sexual affair between a married White woman, Julia Underwood (née Julie Caroline Wells), and a single Black man, William Offet (1854–1914) of Elyria, Ohio. Offet was convicted of rape and served four years of a 15-year sentence, despite his sworn denial of rape (the word of a Black man against that of a White woman). Her husband, Rev. Isaac T. Underwood – after she confessed to him two years later – diligently worked to get Offet out of the penitentiary. After hiring an influential Pittsburgh attorney, Thomas Harlan Baird Patterson (1844–1907), Rev. Underwood prevailed, Offet was released and subsequently pardoned by the Ohio Governor.

On May 21, 1892, Wells published an editorial in the Free Speech refuting what she called "that old threadbare lie that Negro men rape White women. If Southern men are not careful, a conclusion might be reached which will be very damaging to the moral reputation of their women."

Four days later, on May 25, The Daily Commercial published a threat: "The fact that a Black scoundrel [Ida B. Wells] is allowed to live and utter such loathsome and repulsive calumnies is a volume of evidence as to the wonderful patience of Southern Whites. But we've had enough of it." The Evening Scimitar (Memphis) copied the story that same day, but, more specifically raised the threat: "Patience under such circumstances is not a virtue. If the Negroes themselves do not apply the remedy without delay it will be the duty of those whom he has attacked to tie the wretch who utters these calumnies to a stake at the intersection of Main and Madison Sts., brand him in the forehead with a hot iron and perform upon him a surgical operation with a pair of tailor's shears."

A White mob ransacked the Free Speech office, destroying the building and its contents. James L. Fleming, co-owner with Wells and business manager, was forced to flee Memphis; and, reportedly, the trains were being watched for Wells' return. Creditors took possession of the office and sold the assets of the Free Speech. Wells had been out of town, vacationing in Manhattan; she never returned to Memphis. A "committee" of White businessmen, reportedly from the Cotton Exchange, located Rev. Nightingale and, although he had sold his interest to Wells and Fleming in 1891, assaulted him and forced him at gunpoint to sign a letter retracting the May 21 editorial.

Wells subsequently accepted a job with The New York Age and continued her anti-lynching campaign from New York. For the next three years, she resided in Harlem, initially as a guest at the home of Timothy Thomas Fortune (1856–1928) and wife, Carrie Fortune (née Caroline Charlotte Smiley; 1860–1940).

According to Kenneth W. Goings, no copy of the Memphis Free Speech survives. The only knowledge of the newspaper ever existing comes from reprinted articles in other archived newspapers.

Southern Horrors (1892) 

On October 26, 1892, Wells began to publish her research on lynching in a pamphlet titled Southern Horrors: Lynch Law in All Its Phases. Having examined many accounts of lynchings due to the alleged "rape of White women", she concluded that Southerners cried rape as an excuse to hide their real reasons for lynchings: Black economic progress, which threatened White Southerners with competition, and White ideas of enforcing Black second-class status in the society. Black economic progress was a contemporary issue in the South, and in many states Whites worked to suppress Black progress. In this period at the turn of the century, Southern states, starting with Mississippi in 1890, passed laws and/or new constitutions to disenfranchise most Black people and many poor White people through use of poll taxes, literacy tests and other devices.

Wells, in Southern Horrors, adopted the phrase "poor, blind Afro-American Sampsons" to denote Black men as victims of "White Delilahs". The  Biblical "Samson", in the vernacular of the day, came from Longfellow's 1865 poem, "The Warning", containing the line: "There is a poor, blind Samson in the land" To explain the metaphor "Sampson", John Elliott Cairnes, an Irish political economist, in his 1865 article about Black suffrage, wrote that Longfellow was prophesizing; to wit: in "the long-impending struggle for Americans following the Civil War, [he, Longfellow] could see in the Negro only an instrument of vengeance, and a cause of ruin".

The Red Record (1895) 
After conducting further research, Wells published The Red Record, in 1895, a 100-page pamphlet with more detail, describing lynching in the United States since the Emancipation Proclamation of 1863. It also covered Black people's struggles in the South since the Civil War. The Red Record explored the alarmingly high rates of lynching in the United States (which was at a peak from 1880 to 1930). Wells said that during Reconstruction, most Americans outside the South did not realize the growing rate of violence against Black people in the South. She believed that during slavery, White people had not committed as many attacks because of the economic labour value of slaves. Wells noted that, since slavery time, "ten thousand Negroes have been killed in cold blood, [through lynching] without the formality of judicial trial and legal execution".

Frederick Douglass had written an article noting three eras of "Southern barbarism" and the excuses that Whites claimed in each period.

Wells explored these in her The Red Record.
 During the time of slavery, she observed that Whites worked to "repress and stamp out alleged 'race riots or suspected slave rebellions, usually killing Black people in far higher proportions than any White casualties. Once the Civil War ended, White people feared Black people, who were in the majority in many areas. White people acted to control them and suppress them by violence.
 During the Reconstruction Era White people lynched Black people as part of mob efforts to suppress Black political activity and re-establish White supremacy after the war. They feared "Negro Domination" through voting and taking office. Wells urged Black people in high-risk areas to move away to protect their families.
 She observed that Whites frequently claimed that Black men had "to be killed to avenge their assaults upon women". She said that White people assumed that any relationship between a White woman and a Black man was a result of rape. But, given power relationships, it was much more common for White men to take sexual advantage of poor Black women. She stated: "Nobody in this section of the country believes the old threadbare lie that Black men rape White women." Wells connected lynching to sexual violence, showing how the myth of the Black man's lust for White women led to the murder of African-American men.

Wells gave 14 pages of statistics related to lynching cases committed from 1892 to 1895; she also included pages of graphic accounts detailing specific lynchings. She wrote that her data was taken from articles by White correspondents, White press bureaus, and White newspapers. Her delivery of these statistics did not simply reduce the lynchings to numbers, Wells strategically paired the data with descriptive accounts in a way that helped her audience conceptualize the scale of the injustice. This powerful quantification captivated Black and White audiences about the horrors of lynching, through both her circulated works and public oration.

Southern Horrors and The Red Records documentation of lynchings captured the attention of Northerners who knew little about lynching or accepted the common explanation that Black men deserved this fate.

According to the Equal Justice Initiative, 4,084 African Americans were lynched in the South, alone, between 1877 and 1950, of which, 25 percent were accused of sexual assault and nearly 30 percent, murder. Generally southern states and White juries refused to indict any perpetrators for lynching, although they were frequently known and sometimes shown in the photographs being made more frequently of such events.

Despite Wells's attempt to gain support among White Americans against lynching, she believed that her campaign could not overturn the economic interests Whites had in using lynching as an instrument to maintain Southern order and discourage Black economic ventures. Ultimately, Wells concluded that appealing to reason and compassion would not succeed in gaining criminalization of lynching by Southern Whites.  In response to the extreme violence perpetrated upon Black Americans, Wells concluded that armed resistance was a reasonable and effective means to defend against lynching.  She said, a "Winchester rifle should have a place of honor in every black home."

Speaking tours in Britain 
Wells travelled twice to Britain in her campaign against lynching, the first time in 1893 and the second in 1894 in effort to gain the support of such a powerful White nation such as Britain to shame and sanction the racist practices of America. She and her supporters in America saw these tours as an opportunity for her to reach larger, White audiences with her anti-lynching campaign, something she had been unable to accomplish in America. In these travels, Wells notes that her own transatlantic voyages in themselves held a powerful cultural context given the histories of the Middle Passage, and black female identity within the dynamics of segregation. She found sympathetic audiences in Britain, already shocked by reports of lynching in America.
Wells had been invited for her first British speaking tour by Catherine Impey and Isabella Fyvie Mayo. Impey, a Quaker abolitionist who published the journal Anti-Caste, had attended several of Wells' lectures while traveling in America. Mayo was a writer and poet who wrote under the name of Edward Garrett. Both women had read of the particularly gruesome lynching of Henry Smith in Texas and wanted to organize a speaking tour to call attention to American lynchings.

Impey and Mayo asked Frederick Douglass to make the trip, but he declined, citing his age and health. He then suggested Wells, who enthusiastically accepted the invitation. In 1894, before leaving the US for her second visit to Great Britain, Wells called on William Penn Nixon, the editor of the Daily Inter Ocean, a Republican newspaper in Chicago. It was the only major White paper that persistently denounced lynching. After she told Nixon about her planned tour, he asked her to write for the newspaper while in England. She was the first African-American woman to be a paid correspondent for a mainstream White newspaper.

Wells toured England, Scotland and Wales for two months, addressing audiences of thousands, and rallying a moral crusade among the British. She relied heavily on her pamphlet Southern Horrors in her first tour, and showed shocking photographs of actual lynchings in America. On May 17, 1894, she spoke in Birmingham at the Young Men's Christian Assembly and at Central Hall, staying in Edgbaston at 66 Gough Road. On 25 June 1894 at Bradford she gave a "sensational address, though in a quiet and restrained manner".

On the last night of her second tour, the London Anti-Lynching Committee was established – reportedly the first anti-lynching organization in the world. Its founding members included many notables such as the Duke of Argyll, Sir John Gorst, the Archbishop of Canterbury, Lady Henry Somerset and some twenty Members of Parliament, with activist Florence Balgarnie as the honorary secretary.

As a result of her two lecture tours in Britain, Wells received significant coverage in the British and American press. Many of the articles published by the latter at the time of her return to the United States were hostile personal critiques, rather than reports of her anti-lynching positions and beliefs. The New York Times, for example, called her "a slanderous and nasty-minded Mulatress". Despite these attacks from the American press, Wells had nevertheless gained extensive recognition and credibility, and an international audience of supporters for her cause. Wells' tours in Britain even influenced public opinion to the extent that British textile manufacturers fought back with economic strategies, imposing a temporary boycott on Southern cotton that pressured southern businessmen to condemn the practice of lynching publically.

Marriage and family 

On June 27, 1895, in Chicago at Bethel AME Church, Wells married attorney Ferdinand L. Barnett, a widower with two sons, Ferdinand Barnett and Albert Graham Barnett (1886–1962). Ferdinand Lee Barnett, who lived in Chicago, was a prominent attorney, civil rights activist, and journalist. Like Wells, he spoke widely against lynchings and for the civil rights of African Americans. Wells and Barnett had met in 1893, working together on a pamphlet protesting the lack of Black representation at the World's Columbian Exposition in Chicago in 1893. Barnett founded The Chicago Conservator, the first Black newspaper in Chicago, in 1878. Wells began writing for the paper in 1893, later acquired a partial ownership interest, and after marrying Barnett, assumed the role of editor.

Wells' marriage to Barnett was a legal union as well as a partnership of ideas and actions. Both were journalists, and both were established activists with a shared commitment to civil rights. In an interview, Wells' daughter Alfreda said that the two had "like interests" and that their journalist careers were "intertwined". This sort of close working relationship between a wife and husband was unusual at the time, as women often played more traditional domestic roles in a marriage.

In addition to Barnett's two children from his previous marriage, the couple had four more: Charles Aked Barnett (1896–1957), Herman Kohlsaat Barnett (1897–1975), Ida Bell Wells Barnett, Jr. (1901–1988), and Alfreda Marguerita Barnett (married surname Duster; 1904–1983). Charles Aked Barnett's middle name was the surname of Charles Frederic Aked (1864–1941), an influential British-born-turned-American progressive Protestant clergyman who, in 1894, while pastor of the Pembrooke Baptist Church in Liverpool, England, befriended Wells, endorsed her anti-lynching campaign, and hosted her during her second speaking tour in England in 1894.

Wells began writing her autobiography, Crusade for Justice (1928), but never finished the book; it would be posthumously published, edited by her daughter Alfreda Barnett Duster, in 1970, as Crusade for Justice: The Autobiography of Ida B. Wells.In a chapter of Crusade For Justice, titled "A Divided Duty", she described the difficult challenge of splitting her time between family and work. She continued to work after the birth of her first child, traveling and bringing the infant Charles with her. Although she tried to balance her roles as a mother and as a national activist, it was alleged that she was not always successful. Susan B. Anthony said she seemed "distracted".

The establishment by Wells of Chicago's first kindergarten prioritizing Black children, located in the lecture room of the Bethel AME Church, demonstrates how her public activism and her personal life were connected; as her great-granddaughter Michelle Duster notes: "When her older children started getting of school age, then she recognized that black children did not have the same kind of educational opportunities as some other students .... And so, her attitude was, 'Well since it doesn't exist, we'll create it ourselves.

African-American leadership 
The 19th century's acknowledged leader for African-American civil rights Frederick Douglass praised Wells' work, giving her introductions and sometimes financial support for her investigations. When he died in 1895, Wells was perhaps at the height of her notoriety, but many men and women were ambivalent or against a woman taking the lead in Black civil rights at a time when women were not seen as, and often not allowed to be, leaders by the wider society.  For the new leading voices, Booker T. Washington, his rival, W. E. B. Du Bois, and more traditionally minded women activists, Wells often came to be seen as too radical.

Wells encountered and sometimes collaborated with the others, but they also had many disagreements, while also competing for attention for their ideas and programs. For example, there are differing in accounts for why Wells' name was excluded from the original list of founders of the NAACP. In his autobiography Dusk of Dawn, Du Bois implied that Wells chose not to be included. However, in her autobiography, Wells stated that Du Bois deliberately excluded her from the list.

Organizing in Chicago 
Having settled in Chicago, Wells continued her anti-lynching work while becoming more focused on the civil rights of African Americans. She worked with national civil rights leaders to protest a major exhibition, she was active in the national women's club movement, and she ultimately ran for the Illinois State Senate. She also was passionate about women's rights and suffrage. She was a spokeswoman and an advocate for women being successful in the workplace, having  equal opportunities, and creating a name for themselves.

Wells was an active member of the National Equal Rights League (NERL), founded in 1864, and was their representative calling on President Woodrow Wilson to end discrimination in government jobs. In 1914, she served as president of NERL's Chicago bureau.

World's Columbian Exposition 
In 1893, the World's Columbian Exposition was held in Chicago. Together with Frederick Douglass and other Black leaders, Wells organized a Black boycott of the fair, for the fair's lack of representation of African-American achievement in the exhibits. Wells, Douglass, Irvine Garland Penn, and Wells' future husband, Ferdinand L. Barnett, wrote sections of the pamphlet The Reason Why: The Colored American Is Not in the World's Columbian Exposition, which detailed the progress of Blacks since their arrival in America and also exposed the basis of Southern lynchings. Wells later reported to Albion W. Tourgée that copies of the pamphlet had been distributed to more than 20,000 people at the fair. That year she started work with The Chicago Conservator, the oldest African-American newspaper in the city.

Women's clubs 
Living in Chicago in the late 19th century, Wells was very active in the national Woman's club movement. In 1893, she organized The Women's Era Club, a first-of-its-kind civic club for African-American women in Chicago. Wells recruited veteran Chicago activist Mary Richardson Jones to serve as the first chair of the new club in 1894; Jones recruited for the organization and lent it her considerable prestige. It would later be renamed the Ida B. Wells Club in her honor. In 1896, Wells took part in the meeting in Washington, D.C., that founded the National Association of Colored Women's Clubs. After her death, the Ida B. Wells Club went on to do many things. The club advocated to have a housing project in Chicago named after the founder, Ida B. Wells, and succeeded, making history in 1939 as the first housing project named after a woman of color. Wells also helped organize the National Afro-American Council, serving as the organization's first secretary.

Wells received much support from other social activists and her fellow club women. Frederick Douglass praised her work: "You have done your people and mine a service... What a revelation of existing conditions your writing has been for me."

Despite Douglass's praise, Wells was becoming a controversial figure among local and national women's clubs. This was evident when in 1899 the National Association of Colored Women's Clubs intended to meet in Chicago. Writing to the president of the association, Mary Terrell, Chicago organizers of the event stated that they would not cooperate in the meeting if it included Wells. When Wells learned that Terrell had agreed to exclude Wells, she called it "a staggering blow".

School segregation 
In 1900, Wells was outraged when the Chicago Tribune published a series of articles suggesting adoption of a system of racial segregation in public schools.  Given her experience as a school teacher in segregated systems in the South, she wrote to the publisher on the failures of segregated school systems and the successes of integrated public schools. She then went to his office and lobbied him. Unsatisfied, she enlisted the social reformer Jane Addams in her cause. Wells and the pressure group she put together with Addams are credited with stopping the adoption of an officially segregated school system.

Suffrage

Willard controversy 

Wells' role in the U.S. suffrage movement was inextricably linked to her lifelong crusade against racism, violence and discrimination towards African Americans. Her view of women's enfranchisement was pragmatic and political. Like all suffragists she believed in women's right to vote, but she also saw enfranchisement as a way for Black women to become politically involved in their communities and to use their votes to elect African Americans, regardless of gender, to influential political office.

As a prominent Black suffragist, Wells held strong positions against racism, violence and lynching that brought her into conflict with leaders of largely White suffrage organizations. Perhaps the most notable example of this conflict was her very public disagreement with Frances Willard, the first President of the Woman's Christian Temperance Union (WCTU).

The WCTU was a predominantly White women's organization, with branches in every state and a growing membership, including in the Southern United States, where segregation laws and lynching occurred. With roots in the call for temperance and sobriety, the organization later became a powerful advocate of suffrage in the U.S.

In 1893 Wells and Willard travelled separately to Britain on lecture tours. Willard was promoting temperance as well as suffrage for women, and Wells was calling attention to lynching in the U.S. The basis of their dispute was Wells' public statements that Willard was silent on the issue of lynching. Wells referred to an interview Willard had conducted during her tour of the American South, in which Willard had blamed African Americans' behavior for the defeat of temperance legislation. "The colored race multiplies like the locusts of Egypt", Willard had said, and "the grog shop is its center of power. The safety of women, of childhood, of the home is menaced in a thousand localities, so that men dare not go beyond the sight of their own roof tree."

Although Willard and her prominent supporter Lady Somerset were critical of Wells' comments, Wells was able to turn that into her favor, portraying their criticisms as attempts by powerful White leaders to "crush an insignificant colored woman".

Wells also dedicated a chapter in The Red Record to juxtapose the different positions that she and Willard held. The chapter titled "Miss Willard's Attitude" condemned Willard for using rhetoric that promoted violence and other crimes against African Americans in America.

Negro Fellowship League 
Wells, her husband, and some members of their Bible study group, in 1908 founded the Negro Fellowship League (NFL), the first Black settlement house in Chicago. The organization, in rented space, served as a reading room, library, activity center, and shelter for young Black men in the local community at a time when the local Young Men's Christian Association (YMCA) did not allow Black men to become members. The NFL also assisted with job leads and entrepreneurial opportunities for new arrivals in Chicago from Southern States, notably those of the Great Migration. During her involvement, the NFL advocated for women's suffrage and supported the Republican Party in Illinois.

Alpha Suffrage Club 
In the years following her dispute with Willard, Wells continued her anti-lynching campaign and organizing in Chicago. She focused her work on Black women's suffrage in the city following the enactment of a new state law enabling partial women's suffrage. The Illinois Presidential and Municipal Suffrage Bill of 1913 (see Women's suffrage in Illinois) gave women in the state the right to vote for presidential electors, mayor, aldermen and most other local offices; but not for governor, state representatives or members of Congress. Illinois was the first state east of the Mississippi to give women these voting rights.

The prospect of passing the act, even one of partial enfranchisement, was the impetus for Wells and her White colleague Belle Squire to organize the Alpha Suffrage Club in Chicago on January 30, 1913. One of the most important Black suffrage organizations in Chicago, the Alpha Suffrage Club was founded as a way to further voting rights for all women, to teach Black women how to engage in civic matters, and to work to elect African Americans to city offices. Two years after its founding, the club played a significant role in electing Oscar De Priest as the first African-American alderman in Chicago.

As Wells and Squire were organizing the Alpha Club, the National American Woman Suffrage Association (NAWSA) was organizing a suffrage parade in Washington D.C. Marching the day before the inauguration of Woodrow Wilson as president in 1913, suffragists from across the country gathered to demand universal suffrage. Wells, together with a delegation of members from Chicago, attended. On the day of the march, the head of the Illinois delegation told the Wells delegates that the NAWSA wanted "to keep the delegation entirely White", and all African-American suffragists, including Wells, were to walk at the end of the parade in a "colored delegation".

Instead of going to the back with other African Americans, however, Wells waited with spectators as the parade was underway, and stepped into the White Illinois delegation as they passed by.  She visibly linked arms with her White suffragist colleagues, Squire and Virginia Brooks, for the rest of the parade, demonstrating, according to The Chicago Defender, the universality of the women's civil rights movement.

From "race agitator" to political candidate 
During World War I, the U.S. government placed Wells under surveillance, labeling her a dangerous "race agitator".  She defied this threat by continuing civil rights work during this period with such figures as Marcus Garvey, Monroe Trotter, and Madam C. J. Walker.  In 1917, Wells wrote a series of investigative reports for the Chicago Defender on the East St. Louis Race Riots.  After almost thirty years away, Wells made her first trip back to the South in 1921 to investigate and publish a report on the Elaine massacre in Arkansas (published 1922).

In the 1920s, she participated in the struggle for African-American workers' rights, urging Black women's organizations to support the Brotherhood of Sleeping Car Porters, as it tried to gain legitimacy. However, she lost the presidency of the National Association of Colored Women in 1924 to the more diplomatic Mary Bethune. To challenge what she viewed as problems for African Americans in Chicago, Wells started a political organization named Third Ward Women's Political Club in 1927. In 1928, she tried to become a delegate to the Republican National Convention but lost to Oscar De Priest. Her feelings toward the Republican Party became more mixed due to what she viewed as the Hoover administration's poor stance on civil rights and attempts to promote a "Lily-White" policy in Southern Republican organizations. In 1930, Wells unsuccessfully sought elective office, running as an Independent for a seat in the Illinois Senate, against the Republican Party candidate, Adelbert Roberts.

Influence on Black feminist activism 
Wells explained that the defense of White women's honor allowed Southern White men to get away with murder by projecting their own history of sexual violence onto Black men. Her call for all races and genders to be accountable for their actions showed African-American women that they can speak out and fight for their rights. According to some, by portraying the horrors of lynching, she worked to show that racial and gender discrimination are linked, furthering the Black feminist cause.

Legacy and honors 

Since Wells' death, with the rise of mid-20th-century civil rights activism, and the 1971 posthumous publication of her autobiography, interest in her life and legacy has grown. Awards have been established in her name by the National Association of Black Journalists, the Medill School of Journalism at Northwestern University, the Coordinating Council for Women in History, the Type Investigations (formerly the Investigative Fund), the University of Louisville, and the New York County Lawyers' Association (awarded annually since 2003), among many others. The Ida B. Wells Memorial Foundation and the Ida B. Wells Museum have also been established to protect, preserve and promote Wells' legacy. In her hometown of Holly Springs, Mississippi, there is an Ida B. Wells-Barnett Museum named in her honor that acts as a cultural center of African-American history.

In 1941, the Public Works Administration (PWA) built a Chicago Housing Authority public housing project in the Bronzeville neighborhood on the South Side of Chicago; it was named the Ida B. Wells Homes in her honor. The buildings were demolished in August 2011 due to changing demographics and ideas about such housing.

In 1988, she was inducted into the National Women's Hall of Fame. In August that year, she was also inducted into the Chicago Women's Hall of Fame. Molefi Kete Asante included Wells on his list of 100 Greatest African Americans in 2002.  In 2011, Wells was inducted into the Chicago Literary Hall of Fame for her writings.

On February 1, 1990, at the start of Black History Month in the U.S., the U.S. Postal Service dedicated a 25¢ stamp commemorating Wells in a ceremony at the Museum of Science and Industry in Chicago. The stamp, designed by Thomas Blackshear II, features a portrait of Wells illustrated from a composite of photographs of her taken during the mid-1890s. Wells is the 25th African-American entry – and fourth African-American woman – on a U.S. postage stamp. She is the 13th in the Postal Service's Black Heritage series.

In 2006, the Harvard Kennedy School commissioned a portrait of Wells. In 2007, the Ida B. Wells Association was founded by University of Memphis philosophy graduate students to promote discussion of philosophical issues arising from the African-American experience and to provide a context in which to mentor undergraduates. The Philosophy Department at the University of Memphis has sponsored the Ida B. Wells conference every year since 2007.

On February 12, 2012, Mary E. Flowers, a member of the Illinois House of Representatives, introduced House Resolution 770 during the 97th General Assembly, honoring Ida B. Wells by declaring March 25, 2012 – the  anniversary of her death – as Ida B. Wells Day in the State of Illinois.

In August 2014, Wells was the subject of an episode of the BBC Radio 4 programme Great Lives, in which her work was championed by Baroness Oona King. Wells was honored with a Google Doodle on July 16, 2015, which would have been her 153rd birthday.

In 2016, the Ida B. Wells Society for Investigative Reporting was launched in Memphis, Tennessee, with the purpose of promoting investigative journalism. Following in the footsteps of Wells, this society encourages minority journalists to expose injustices perpetuated by the government and defend people who are susceptible to being taken advantage of. This organization was created with much support from the Open Society Foundations, Ford Foundation, and CUNY Graduate School of Journalism.

In 2018, the National Memorial for Peace and Justice opened, including a reflection space dedicated to Wells, a selection of quotes by her, and a stone inscribed with her name.

On March 8, 2018, The New York Times published a belated obituary for her, in a series marking International Women's Day and entitled "Overlooked", which set out to acknowledge that, since 1851, the newspaper's obituary pages had been dominated by White men, while notable women – including Wells – had been ignored.

In July 2018, Chicago's City Council officially renamed Congress Parkway as Ida B. Wells Drive; it is the first downtown Chicago street named after a woman of color.

On February 12, 2019, a blue plaque, provided by the Nubian Jak Community Trust, was unveiled by the mayor of Birmingham, Yvonne Mosquito, at the Edgbaston Community Centre, Birmingham, England, commemorating Wells' stay in a house on the exact site of 66 Gough Road where she stayed in 1893 during her speaking tour of the British Isles.

On July 13, 2019, a marker for her was unveiled in Mississippi, on the northeast corner of Holly Springs' Courthouse Square.  The marker was dedicated by the Wells-Barnett Museum and the Jewish American Society for Historic Preservation.

In 2019, a new middle school in Washington, D.C., was named in her honor. On November 7, 2019, a Mississippi Writers Trail historical marker was installed at Rust College in Holly Springs, commemorating the legacy of Ida B. Wells.

On May 4, 2020, she was posthumously awarded a Pulitzer Prize special citation, "for her outstanding and courageous reporting on the horrific and vicious violence against African Americans during the era of lynching." The Pulitzer Prize board announced that it would donate at least $50,000 in support of Wells' mission to recipients who would be announced at a later date.

In 2021, a public high school in Portland, Oregon, that had been named for Woodrow Wilson was renamed Ida B. Wells High School.

Monuments 

In 2021 Chicago erected a monument to Wells in the Bronzeville neighborhood, near where she lived and close to the site of the former Ida B. Wells Homes housing project. Officially called The Light of Truth Ida B. Wells National Monument (based on her quote, "the way to right wrongs is to cast the light of truth upon them"), it was created by sculptor Richard Hunt.

Also in 2021, Memphis dedicated a new Ida B. Wells plaza with a life-sized statue of Wells. The monument is adjacent to the historic Beale Street Baptist Church, where Wells produced the Free Speech newspaper.

Representation in media
In 1949 the anthology radio drama Destination Freedom recapped parts of her life in the episode "Woman with a Mission".

The PBS documentary series American Experience aired on December 19, 1989 – season 2, episode 11 (one-hour) – "Ida B. Wells: A Passion for Justice", written and directed by William Greaves. The documentary featured excerpts of Wells' memoirs read by Toni Morrison. (viewable via YouTube)

In 1995, the play In Pursuit of Justice: A One-Woman Play About Ida B. Wells, written by Wendy D. Jones (born 1953) and starring Janice Jenkins, was produced. It draws on historical incidents and speeches from Wells' autobiography, and features fictional letters to a friend. It won four awards from the AUDELCO (Audience Development Committee Inc.), an organization that honors Black theater.

In 1999, a staged reading of the play Iola's Letter, written by Michon Boston (née Michon Alana Boston; born 1962), was performed at Howard University in Washington, D.C., under the direction of Vera J. Katz, including then-student Chadwick Boseman among the cast. The play is inspired by the real-life events that compelled a 29-year-old Ida B. Wells to launch an anti-lynching crusade from Memphis in 1892 using her newspaper, Free Speech.

Wells' life is the subject of Constant Star (2002), a widely performed musical drama by Tazewell Thompson, who was inspired to write it by the 1989 documentary Ida B. Wells: A Passion for Justice. Thompson's play explores Wells as "a seminal figure in Post-Reconstruction America".

Wells was played by Adilah Barnes in the 2004 film Iron Jawed Angels. The film dramatizes a moment during the Woman Suffrage Parade of 1913 when Wells ignored instructions to march with the segregated parade units and crossed the lines to march with the other members of her Illinois chapter.

Selected publications 
 
 
 
 
 Crusade for Justice: The Autobiography of Ida B. Wells. 1970 — via The University of Pennsylvania School of Arts and Sciences.

See also 
 Frederick Douglass
 Booker T. Washington
 Harriet Tubman
 List of civil rights leaders
 List of suffragists and suffragettes
 List of women's rights activists
 Timeline of women's suffrage
 Black feminism

Bibliography

Annotations

Notes

References to linked inline notes 
Books, journals, magazines, academic papers, online blogs

 
Print:
 Book (1st ed.) (July 31, 1999); 
 Book (10th ed.) (February 1, 2000): ; 
<li> Book (11th ed.) (2011): 
Exhibitions, film, digital:
 Roth Horowitz Gallery, 160A East 70th Street, Manhattan (January 14, 2000 – February 12, 2000); Andrew Roth and Glenn Horowitz, gallery co-owners, Witness: Photographs of Lynchings from the Collection of James Allen and John Littlefield, organized by Andrew Roth
 Andy Warhol Museum (September 22, 2001 – February 21, 2002), The Without Sanctuary Project, curated by James Allen; co-directed by Jessica Arcand and Margery King
<li> The 2002 short film, Without Sanctuary, directed by Matt Dibble (né Matthew Phillips Dibble; born 1959) and produced by Joseph F. Jordan, PhD (né Joseph Ferdinand Jordan, Jr.; born 1951), accompanied the 2002–2003 exhibition by the same name, Without Sanctuary, at the Martin Luther King Jr. National Historical Park (co-sponsored by Emory University)
 Digital format (2008):  (Overview, Movie, Photos, Forum)
<li> ; part of collection at the Robert W. Woodruff Library at Emory University
 
 

 
 
 
 
 
 
 . .
 .

  Note: the article is not in the print edition (back issues at ISSUU). 
 
 
 
 
  Google Doodles Archive. 
 

 
  (Also accessible online: "Wells-Barnett, Ida" via encyclopedia.com. Retrieved November 7, 2020.) 
 
 
 
 

  Related articles: Albion Mourgée and Plessey v. Ferguson. OCLC all editions.
 

 
 
 

 
 
 
 
 

 

 
 
 .

 Citing → Quoting → 
 
 

 
 
 
 
 
 
 
 
 . . .

 
 
 
 
 
 
 

 

  (paper).  (ejournal). . 
 
 
  Alternate link via ISSUU (a version of this story was published in the June 1983 issue of Memphis). 
  (link via Google Books; Perkins, among other things, was, in 2007, inducted into the College of Fellows of the American Theatre (see CV); Stephens retired as Professor of Humanities and Theatre at Penn State Schuylkill, where she had been an educator since 1977)
 "Michon Boston" (1962–), pp. 366–367
<li> Iola's Letter (1994), pp. 368–408
 
 
 
  Review of the 1893 work, The Reason Why the Colored American Is Not in the World's Columbian Exposition: The Afro-American Contribution to Columbian Literature, by Ida B. Wells, Frederick Douglass, Irvine Garland Penn, and Ferdinand Barnett. Re-published 1999. Robert W. Rydell (ed.); Urbana and Chicago: University of Illinois Press
 

 ).

 
  (Also accessible online: "Ida B. Wells-Barnett" via the Christian Broadcasting Network. Retrieved November 7, 2020.) 

 
 
 
 
 
 

 (this book, Vol. 15 of a 16-vol. set, is an adaptation of Thompson's 1979 PhD dissertation at George Washington University).
  (webcast via Library of Congress). 
 
 

 
 
 
 

 

 
 
 
 
 . Library of Congress, Manuscript/Mixed Material – . Also transcribed by Project Gutenberg →  (released February 8, 2005).
 
  
 
 
 

 

 

News media

  (also LCCN ) 

 
 
 
 

 
 
  Digitized print edition. The online edition, here, is dated March 26, 2019. 

 

 
 
 

 
 
 

 

 

 

 

 

 

  
 
   Originally published June 20, 2018, in The Lily of The Washington Post, which, in turn,  was an adaptation of a story in The Washington Post by Peter Slevin published June 15, 2015, titled "You Can't Just Gloss Over This History': The Movement to Honor Ida B. Wells Gains Momentum." 
 

 
  .
 Reprinted by the New York Call (July 23, 1911). "The Negro's Quest for Work". . .
<li> Transcribed and published by The Black Worker (1900 to 1919). Vol. 5. Foner, Philip Sheldon (1910–1994); Lewis, Ronald L. (eds.). Part I: "Economic Condition of the Black Worker at the Turn of the Twentieth-Century". Temple University Press. pp. 38–39 – via . .
 

Government and genealogical archives

General references (not linked to notes) 

 

 

 (portraits from the book have been digitized and are archived at the New York Public Library, Schomburg Center for Research in Black Culture, Jean Blackwell Hutson Research and Reference Division;  – click on "Digital Gallery").

   (the author published a PhD dissertation under the same title in 2000 at Northwestern University)

Further reading 

 
 Ida B. Wells (1862–1931) (Biography)
 Ida B. Wells, "Lynch Law" (1893), History Is a Weapon Website

 Davidson, James West. 'They say': Ida B. Wells and the Reconstruction of Race. Oxford University Press, 2009. . .
 Dray, Philip, Yours for Justice, Ida B. Wells: The Daring Life of a Crusading Journalist, Peachtree, 2008.

 
<li> "Ida B. Wells, 1862–1931"
<li> "The Writing of Ida B. Wells"
<li> A Red Record: Tabulated Statistics and Alleged Causes of Lynchings in the United States, 1892–1893–1894
<li> "About Ida B. Wells and Her Writings". Schechter, Patricia Ann, PhD. Portland State University.
<li> "Biography of Ida B Wells"
<li> "The Anti-Lynching Pamphlets of Ida B. Wells, 1892–1920"
<li> "Video" – In the videos, Schechter talks about Wells' experiences and legacy – archive link  via Wayback Machine. Archived from the original on July 19, 2008 (14 files archived in RealMedia format). Retrieved March 28, 2008.

 

 

 
 This work was originally posted on a blog that was part of UNC's Long Civil Rights Movement Project – The LCRM Project. It was funded by the Andrew W. Mellon Foundation and UNC for five years, from 2008 to 2012, and its published works were a collaboration of (i) the UNC Special Collections Library, (ii) the University of North Carolina Press, and (iii) the Southern Oral History Program in UNC's Center for the Study of the American South. A fourth partner during the project's first three years was the Center for Civil Rights of UNC's School of Law.
 
 

  Republication of "Lynching: Our National Crime", Wells' speech delivered during the 1909 National Negro Conference, published in the book, Proceedings of the National Negro Conference, 1909. pp. 174–179. New York: May 31 and June 1 – book is accessible via Internet Archive).

External links 

 
 
 Norwood, Arlisha. "Ida B. Wells". National Women's History Museum. 2017.
 Ida B. Wells Papers, 1884–1976. Joseph Regenstein Library, University of Chicago Library, Special Collections Research Center; 
 "Wells, Ida B." (family photo) University of Chicago Library, Special Collections Research Center, Photo Archive

1862 births
1931 deaths
Activists for African-American civil rights
African-American feminists
African-American media personalities
African-American journalists
African-American women journalists
African-American suffragists
American suffragists
African-American writers
American anti-lynching activists
American freedmen
American women's rights activists
Fisk University alumni
Free speech activists
Illinois Independents
Illinois Republicans
Journalists from Illinois
Journalists from Tennessee
Mississippi Republicans
People from Chicago
People from Holly Springs, Mississippi
Progressive Era in the United States
Rust College alumni
American women sociologists
American sociologists
Clubwomen
19th-century American journalists
19th-century American slaves
20th-century African-American women
NAACP activists
African-American women in politics
19th-century American women educators
19th-century American educators
Women civil rights activists
African-American history in Chicago
19th-century African-American writers
19th-century African-American women writers
19th-century American women writers
People born in the Confederate States